Branwhite is a surname. Notable people with the surname include:

Charles Branwhite (1817–1880), English landscape painter
Nathan Cooper Branwhite ( 1775–1857), English miniature portrait painter, watercolorist, and engraver
Peregrine Branwhite (1745– 1795), English poet